California's 14th district may refer to:

 California's 14th congressional district
 California's 14th State Assembly district
 California's 14th State Senate district